Torrent is a village and municipality in the comarca of Baix Emporda, province of Girona and autonomous community of Catalonia, Spain.

References

External links
 Government data pages 

Municipalities in Baix Empordà
Populated places in Baix Empordà